The following is a list of people executed by the U.S. state of Ohio since 1999.

All of the following people have been executed for murder since the Gregg v. Georgia decision. All 56 were executed by lethal injection. However, any future execution will no longer be performed using this method, due to a ruling by Governor Mike DeWine in December 2020. Notable persons executed in Ohio before the Gregg decision include Anna Marie Hahn.

Notes

See also 
 Capital punishment in Ohio
 Capital punishment in the United States

References 

 
Ohio
Executed